Kruppomenia  is a genus of solenogaster, a kind of shell-less, worm-like, marine mollusk.  

One species is 2.5 mm long.

Species
 Kruppomenia angolensis Gil-Mansilla, García-Álvarez & Urgorri, 2012
 Kruppomenia borealis Odhner, 1920
 Kruppomenia bulla Zamarro, García-Álvarez & Urgorri, 2015
 Kruppomenia delta Scheltema & Schander, 2000
 Kruppomenia genslerae Ostermair, Brandt, Haszprunar, Jörger & Bergmeier, 2018
 Kruppomenia glandulata Gil-Mansilla, García-Álvarez & Urgorri, 2012
 Kruppomenia levis Scheltema & Schander, 2000
 Kruppomenia macrodenticulata Gil-Mansilla, García-Álvarez & Urgorri, 2012
 Kruppomenia macrodoryata Todt & Salvini-Plawen, 2003
 Kruppomenia minima Nierstrasz, 1903
 [[Kruppomenia nanodentata]] Todt & Salvini-Plawen, 2003
 Kruppomenia rhynchota (Salvini-Plawen, 1978)
 Kruppomenia vitucoi Zamarro & García-Álvarez, 2015

References

 Nierstrasz, H.F. 1903. Kruppomenia minima n. g. n. sp. S. Lo Bianco, Le pesche abissali del Mediterraneo. Mittheilungen aus der Zoologischen Station zu Neapal, 16:109-278
 García-Álvarez O. & Salvini-Plawen L.v. (2007). Species and diagnosis of the families and genera of Solenogastres (Mollusca). Iberus 25(2): 73-143

External links
 Cobo, M. C.; Kocot, K. M. (2020). Micromenia amphiatlantica sp. nov.: First solenogaster (Mollusca, Aplacophora) with an amphi-Atlantic distribution and insight into abyssal solenogaster diversity. Deep Sea Research Part I: Oceanographic Research Papers. 157: 103189

Simrothiellidae